Al-Wahda is a professional basketball club. It is a part of the Al-Wahda Sports Club, which is based in Damascus, Syria. The team changed its name in 1972 to the name they use today. It is known for being one of the pillars in the sport not only in the capital Damascus, but in all of Syria. Al-Wahda won the FIBA Asia Champions Cup in 2003.

History

The team was founded in 1928 under the name Al-Qasioun Sports Club by Ahmed Ezzat Rifai, who was its original founder, being one of the oldest teams in the Arab world, who founded it as a sports team, encompassing basketball.

The club's golden age began in the 1990s, when the team was able to beat both the Aleppo clubs, Al Jalaa and Al Ittihad, and became the SBL champion in the 1994 season. Until the 2003 season, Al-Wahda SC absolutely dominated the domestic scene with 6 Syrian league titles. In the 1999-2004 seasons, they also won the Syrian Basketball Cup. 

During its golden era, Al Wahda has established itself mainly at the international level. In the 1998 season, the club debuted in the first year of the West Asian Champions Cup, where it took 4th place. In the 2000 season, the club played for the second time in WABA League, which it managed to win, and advanced to the Asian Cup for the first time. 

In the 2001 season, the team was able to defend their title in the WABA League and, after advancing to the Asian Cup in a tough competition after winning over Winling Hong Kong, placed third. In the 2002-03 season, Al-Wahda SC achieved the greatest success in the history of the club and Syrian basketball. At the FIBA ​​Asian Cup in Kuala Lumpur, after winning the basic group, they advanced to the semifinals, where they defeated 
Sangmu FC 107:78 and in the final Al-Rayyan SC 96:63. In the following season, the club managed to advance to the Asian Cup after finishing second in the 2004 WABA League, where they won the group and advanced to the quarterfinals. After advancing to the finals, the club failed to defend the title, as it lost to Sagesse SC 70:72.

In 2014, after 11 years, the Wahda SC team won the SBL title after a 79:67 final win over Al-Ittihad. In 2015, Al Wahda defeated Al-Ittihad SC in the final and won its ninth title and the second in a row. In 2017, the club won the Syrian Cup and thus its last title. 

The club's latest success is participating in the SBL final in the 2021 season, where it lost to Al Karamah SC 64:79 in the first match, won 74:69 in the second and lost 51:74 in the third. In the 2022 season, the team advanced to the Syrian Super Cup final, where it was beaten by Al-Ittihad 52:60.

Home arena
Al-Fayhaa Sports Arena: 1976–present

Club rivalries
The biggest rival of the club is Al-Jaish SC, the biggest city derby in Damascus are playing against each other. Also they have a rivalry with Al-Ittihad Aleppo.

Honours

Domestic
Syrian Basketball League
Winners (9): 1993/1994 - 1996/1997 - 1997/1998 - 1998/1999 - 2000/2001 - 2001/2002 - 2002/2003 - 2013/2014 - 2014/2015
Runners-Up (1): 2020/2021
Syrian Basketball Cup
Winners (7): 1999 - 2000 - 2001 - 2002 - 2003 - 2004 - 2017 - 2022
Syrian Basketball Super Cup
Winners (1): 2022
Runners-Up (1): 2021
Damascus Basketball Tournament
Third place (1): 2009

Asian
FIBA Asia Champions Cup
Winners (1): 2003
Runners-Up (1): 2004
Third Place (2): 2001 - 2002

WABA Champions Cup
Winners (2): 2000 - 2001
Runners-Up (1): 2004
Dubai International Tournament
Third place (1): 2011

Sponsorship
As of 2022, the main partners of the club are  Cham Wings, Syria Gulf Bank, Lactomil (men team) and Dermexcel (women team).

Current roster
Squad for the 2021–2022 Syrian Basketball League season:

Past rosters
2010-2011:

Transfers
Transfers for the 2021-22 season:

 Joining
  Ala'a Edelbi from  Al-Jaish SC
  Omar Edelbi from  Al-Thawra SC
  Hani Adribe from  Al-Jaish SC
  Chris Crawford from  SLAC
  Mohamed Hdidane from  US Monastir
  Omar Abada from  Al-Ittihad Jeddah
 
 Leaving
  Al Hakam Abdullah to  Al-Jaish SC
  Tarek Aljabi to  Al-Karamah SC

Notable players

Anwar Abdel-Hay
Tarif Qutrash
Anas Al-Khouli
Sherif Al-Sharif
Ashraf Al-Darkazli
Basel Raya
Andrea Bates
Fayez Hinnawi 
Khaled Zidan
Tariq Ali Moussa

Head coaches
  Hady Darwish (2006–2012)
  Rateb Sheikh Najeeb 
  Gennadi Samarskiy
  Frederick Onika

Club presidents
 List of Al Wahda presidents since 1974:

Season by season

References

External links
Unofficial Fan Site and Forum 
Asia-basket

Wahda
Sport in Damascus
Basketball teams established in 1928